Glamour Boys may refer to:

 Glamour Boys (politicians), a group of homosexual British Members of Parliament in the 1930s
 "Glamour Boys" (song), a 1988 song by Living Colour
 Shane Sewell (born 1972), Canadian professional wrestler, ring name Glamour Boy Shane
 Val Venis (born 1971), Canadian professional wrestler, ring name Glamour Boy Sean
 An all-male Nollywood movie directed by Jeta Amata inspired by Glamour Girls

See also
 "Glamour Boy", a 1973 song by The Guess Who
 Glamour Boy (film), a 1941 American comedy
 Glamour (disambiguation)